The 2016–17 Baltic Men Volleyball League, known as Credit 24 Champions League for sponsorship reasons, was the 12th edition of the highest level of club volleyball in the Baltic states.

Participating teams

The following teams took part in the 2016–17 edition of Baltic Men Volleyball League.

Venues and personnel

Main Tournament
All participating 14 clubs were playing according to the double round robin system.

|}
Updated to match(es) played on 5 March 2017. Source: Credit24 Champions League

Playoffs
The four winners of each series qualified to the Final Four, while the other four teams were eliminated.

Final four
Organizer: Bigbank Tartu 
Venue: Võru Sports Centre, Võru, Estonia

Semifinals

|}

3rd place match

|}

Final

|}

Final ranking

Final four awards

Most Valuable Player
  Siim Põlluäär (Rakvere)
Best Setter
  Artis Caics (Rakvere)
Best Outside Hitters
  Tanel Uusküla (Rakvere)
  Taavet Leppik (Pärnu)

Best Middle Blockers
  Toms Švans (Pärnu)
  Kaupo Kivisild (Rakvere)
Best Opposite Spiker
  Siim Põlluäär (Rakvere)
Best Libero
  Rait Rikberg (Bigbank Tartu)

References

Credit24 Champions League 2016/2017 volley.ee

External links
Official website 

Baltic Men Volleyball League
Baltic Men Volleyball League
Baltic Men Volleyball League
Baltic Men Volleyball League
Baltic Men Volleyball League
Baltic Men Volleyball League
Baltic Men Volleyball League
Baltic Men Volleyball League
Baltic Men Volleyball League
Baltic Men Volleyball League